Sevenia dubiosa is a butterfly in the family Nymphalidae. It is found in western Tanzania, the eastern part of the Democratic Republic of the Congo and northern Zambia. The habitat consists of forests and woodland.

Adults are attracted to bananas.

References

Butterflies described in 1911
dubiosa